Expecting to Fly is the debut studio album by the Bluetones. It was released on 12 February 1996, knocking Oasis's (What's the Story) Morning Glory? off the number-one spot in the UK Albums Chart for a week. The album is currently certified Platinum by the BPI. Its singles were "Bluetonic", "Slight Return" and "Cut Some Rug".

A 2 CD Expanded Edition of the album was released on 9 March 2009.

Production
The majority of Expecting to Fly was recorded at Ridge Farm Studios in mid 1995, except for "Talking to Clarry", which was done in late 1995. Hugh Jones produced the sessions, and mixed the recordings with engineer Helen Woodward. The album was later mastered by Geoff Pesche.

Reception

Sam Taylor in Q wrote, "Perhaps the most accomplished rock debut album since The Stone Roses in 1989, Expecting to Fly avoids the usual primitive drive of first recordings, in favour of technical brilliance and adventurous songwriting... a classic rock album." List journalist Brian Donaldson likened The Bluetones to "a Squeeze for the 90s", and noted that the record has "excellence exhibited throughout". David Sinclair of Rolling Stone called the album "an accomplished and varied collection of guitar-based tunes with a solid charm rooted in the best traditions of English alternative pop—no more, but certainly no less."

Melody Maker placed it at no. 19 on their list of 1996's Albums of the Year. NME ranked the LP at no. 11 in their 1996 critic poll.

Commercial performance
Expecting to Fly entered the UK Albums Chart at number one on first-week sales of 82,000. The album was certified platinum by the BPI in March 1998 for sales of 300,000.

Track listing
All tracks written by Morriss, Chesters, Devlin, Morriss, except where noted.

 "Talking to Clarry" – 6:52
 "Bluetonic" – 4:08 (Morriss, Chesters, Devlin, Morriss, Mitchell)
 "Cut Some Rug" – 4:32
 "Things Change" – 5:38
 "The Fountainhead" – 4:35
 "Carnt Be Trusted" – 3:50
 "Slight Return" – 3:21
 "Putting Out Fires" – 6:22
 "Vampire" – 4:32
 "A Parting Gesture" – 4:40
 "Time & Again" – 5:09

Collector's edition disc 2

 "A Parting Guesture" (R1 The John Peel Show, 1994)
 "Cut Some Rug" (R1 The John Peel Show, 1994)
 "Bluetonic" (R1 The Mark Radcliffe Show, May 1995)
 "Are You Blue or Are You Blind?" (R1 The Mark Radcliffe Show, May 1995)
 "Fountainhead" (R1 The Mark Radcliffe Show, May 1995)
 "Time & Again" (R1 The Mark Radcliffe Show, May 1995)
 "Driftwood" (R1 The Evening Session, July 1995)
 "Can't Be Trusted" (R1 The Evening Session, July 1995)
 "Are You Blue or Are You Blind?" (Sound City 1995 Bristol)
 "Cut Some Rug" (Sound City 1995 Bristol)
 "Can't Be Trusted" (Sound City 1995 Bristol)
 "Bluetonic" (Sound City 1995 Bristol)
 "Time & Again" (Sound City 1995 Bristol)

Personnel
Personnel per booklet.

The Bluetones
 Scott Morriss – bass, backing vocals
 Adam Devlin – guitar, 12 string guitar
 Mark Morriss – vocals
 Eds Chesters – drums, percussion

Additional musicians
 Caroline LaVelle – cello (track 8)
 Dan Crompton – blues harp (track 10)
 Mac McEldon – clavinet (track 4)

Production
 Hugh Jones – producer, mixing
 Helen Woodward – mixing engineer
 Geoff Pesche – mastering

Design
 Superstock – front cover photography
 Marc Newman – front cover photography
 Roger Sargent – band photography
 Scott Morriss – additional photography
 Trevor Ray Hart – additional photography
 The Bluetones – artwork concept

Charts

Weekly charts

Year-end charts

References

External links
 

1996 debut albums
The Bluetones albums
Albums produced by Hugh Jones (producer)
Jangle pop albums